Real Sociedad de Fútbol, S.A.D., more commonly referred to as Real Sociedad (Royal Society), Erreala or Reala in Basque, La Real in Spanish, is a Basque professional sports club in the city of San Sebastián, Basque Country, founded on 7 September 1909. It plays its home matches at the Anoeta Stadium.

Real Sociedad won the Liga title in 1980–81 and 1981–82, and finished runner-up in 1979–80, 1987–88, and 2002–03. The club has also won the Copa del Rey three times, in 1909, 1987 and 2020. It contests the Basque derby against rivals Athletic Bilbao. Real Sociedad was a founding member of La Liga in 1929; its longest spell in the top flight was for 40 seasons, from 1967 to 2007.

Traditionally the club followed a policy (similar to that of its rival Athletic) of signing only Basque players, before signing Republic of Ireland forward John Aldridge in 1989. While a strong Basque contingent has been retained among its players, nowadays both non-Basque Spaniards and foreign players are represented at the club. Its youth section subsequent to the all-Basque era has still been very successful in developing internationally renowned players, such as World Cup winners Xabi Alonso and Antoine Griezmann.

The club has competed in the UEFA Champions League four times. In the 2013-14 season, the team finished 4th place in the group stage. In the 2003-04 season, the club progressed to the round of 16 before losing to Lyon. In the 1982–83 European Cup, its predecessor tournament, the team reached the semifinals, only to lose narrowly against Hamburger SV. In the 1981-82, the club lost in the first round against CSKA Sofia

Aside from football (including a women's team), Real Sociedad also has several sections in athletics, including track and field, field hockey and basque pelota.

History

Early history

Football was introduced to San Sebastián in the early 1900s by students and workers returning from Britain. In 1904, they formed San Sebastián Recreation Club, the first football club in the city, and in 1905 the club competed in the Copa del Rey. In 1907, a conflict between the club's members caused the team to split with several players (such as Alfonso and Miguel Sena and Domingo Arrillaga) leaving to create a new team in 1908, the San Sebastian Football Club. This team applied to enter the 1909 Copa del Rey, but complications over registration permits saw them compete as Club Ciclista de San Sebastián. This team convincingly defeated the powerful Athletic Club 4–2 in the quarter-finals and then beat Club Español de Madrid 3–1 in the final. A notable figure of this team was George McGuinness, who netted 6 goals in the tournament including the opener in the final.

A few months after this victory, the players who had won the tournament founded the Sociedad de Futbol on 7 September 1909. Sociedad applied to enter the 1910 Copa del Rey, but once again had to compete under a different name, Vasconia de San Sebastián, and once again they reached the final (UECF), where they were beaten by Athletic (0–1). In the same year, King Alfonso XIII – who used San Sebastián as his summer capital – gave the club his patronage, where it subsequently became known as Real Sociedad de Fútbol. The first final the club played as Real Sociedad was in 1913, where FC Barcelona needed three games to beat them. After a 15-year hiatus, Sociedad reached the 1928 final, which was remarkably similar to their previous one since Barcelona again needed three games to beat them at El Sardinero.

Real Sociedad was a founding member of La Liga in 1929. The team came fourth with Francisco "Paco" Bienzobas finishing as the top scorer. The team's name was changed to Donostia Club de Futbol in 1931 with the advent of the Second Spanish Republic, but changed back to Real Sociedad after the Spanish Civil War in 1939. The team has generally fluctuated between the Primera and Segunda divisions, in one period (during the 1940s) managing to be relegated and promoted seven times. Around that time, the sculptor Eduardo Chillida was the team's goalkeeper until injury put a stop to his football career.

The success of the 1980s
The team finished as runners-up in La Liga for the first time in 1979–80, gaining 52 points compared to Real Madrid's 53, and 13 points clear of third-placed Sporting de Gijón. Real Sociedad won its first ever Primera División title at the end of the 1980–81 season, denying Real Madrid a fourth-consecutive title because although both clubs earned 45 points and Madrid had the superior goal difference Sociedad were better in the head-to-heads. This qualified La Real for the 1981–82 European Cup, where they were eliminated in the first round by CSKA Sofia of Bulgaria, who hosted and won the first leg 1–0. The second leg in Spain was a 0–0 draw.

The club retained the Liga title the following season, beating Barcelona by 47 points to 45, under the management of Alberto Ormaetxea. Forward Jesús María Satrústegui was the club's top scorer for 1980–81 with 16 goals. He scored 13 the following season as Pedro Uralde was the top scorer, with 14. The club reached the semi-finals of the 1982–83 European Cup, defeating Víkingur of Iceland, Celtic and Sporting Clube de Portugal before losing 3–2 on aggregate to eventual champions Hamburger SV. Real Sociedad won the Supercopa de España at the beginning of the 1982–83 season, overturning a 1–0 defeat in the first leg to defeat Real Madrid 4–1 on aggregate.

On 11 March 1987, Real Sociedad set a record for most goals in a quarter-final of the Copa del Rey after defeating Mallorca 10–1. In the semi-finals of the same tournament, it beat its Basque rivals Athletic Bilbao 1–0 over two legs. On 27 June 1987, Real Sociedad won its first Copa del Rey title, defeating Atlético Madrid 4–2 on penalties after drawing 2–2. The match was held at La Romareda in Zaragoza, Aragon. In the following season's Copa del Rey, Real Sociedad defeated Atlético Madrid again after defeating them in the quarter-finals. It then beat Real Madrid 5–0 on aggregate in the semi-finals, but lost 1–0 in the final to Barcelona at Real Madrid's Santiago Bernabéu Stadium on 30 March 1988. In the 1987–88 La Liga, Real Sociedad were runners-up for the first time since its lost its title – with 51 points to Real Madrid's 62 – and three points clear of third-placed Atlético Madrid.

For many years, Real Sociedad followed the practice of its Basque rivals Athletic Bilbao of signing only Basque players. It abandoned the policy in 1989 when it signed Irish international John Aldridge from Liverpool. Aldridge scored 16 goals in his first season to be the club's top scorer, and fourth-highest scorer of the entire league as La Real finished fifth. In 1990, La Real signed an English striker, Dalian Atkinson of Sheffield Wednesday, who therefore became the club's first black player. He scored 12 goals in his first season, second at the club only to Aldridge's 17. That was Aldridge's final season at La Real, and he left to play in the lower English leagues at Tranmere Rovers, while Atkinson left to join top-flight Aston Villa.

In 1997–98, Real Sociedad finished third, its best finish since being runners-up for the first time since 1988. Its total of 63 points was 11 less than champions Barcelona but just two less than runners-up Athletic Bilbao. The club finished higher in the table than Real Madrid due to a superior goal differential. Yugoslav striker Darko Kovačević scored 17 times that season, making him the fourth-highest scorer in the league. The third-place finish qualified La Real for the 1998–99 UEFA Cup, where it beat Sparta Prague and Dynamo Moscow before being knocked out in the third round by Atlético Madrid.

21st century

After finishing in 13th position for three consecutive seasons, Real Sociedad were runners-up in the 2002–03 La Liga, its best finish since 1988. Its tally of 76 points was only beaten by Real Madrid's 78, and La Real had four more points than third-placed Deportivo de La Coruña. The club was managed by Frenchman Raynald Denoueix. La Real's strikeforce combined the Turkish striker Nihat Kahveci with Yugoslav international Darko Kovačević. The two were third and fourth top scorer in the league respectively, with 23 and 20 goals. The team also included Dutch international goalkeeper Sander Westerveld and Xabi Alonso in midfield. Alonso was the winner of the 2003 Don Balón award for the best Spanish player in the league, while Kahveci was voted the best foreign player and Denoueix the best manager.

Key moments from that season came when Real Sociedad beat Real Madrid in April 4–2 at the Anoeta Stadium. It kept first place in La Liga until the penultimate game of 38, when it lost 3–2 away to Celta de Vigo, while Real Madrid beat Atlético Madrid 4–0. This meant that Real Madrid secured first place two points clear of Real Sociedad for the last game, where La Real defeated Atlético Madrid 3–0 and Real Madrid beat Athletic Bilbao to win the title. The team qualified directly for the 2003–04 UEFA Champions League after finishing second; it was unbeaten at home, scored 71 goals in total and lost just six times.

Real Sociedad were placed in Group D of the 2003–04 Champions League with Juventus, Galatasaray and Olympiacos. The team won two matches, drew three and lost away to Juventus to finish second and advance to the last 16. It was knocked out after losing 1–0 in both games against Lyon, hosting the first game. The 2003–04 La Liga saw a dramatic decline in the club's performance, slipping to 15th out of 20. Their tally of 46 points was only five more than relegated Real Valladolid.

On 9 September 2006, Real Sociedad played its 2,000th La Liga match. That same season, they were relegated from La Liga, finishing 19th and ended a 40-year streak there, their longest ever stay in the top flight. On 9 July 2007, former Welsh international and Fulham manager Chris Coleman was appointed as the new club coach, on the recommendation of former Real Sociedad manager John Toshack, an important board member at the club. Coleman resigned on 16 January 2008.

In the 2012–13 season, Real Sociedad finished in fourth place and qualified for the 2013–14 Champions League for the first time since the 2003–04 season, but in the play-offs, this time. In the play-offs, the club defeated Lyon 2–0 in both legs to qualify for the group stage. Real Sociedad, however, did not make it out of the group, earning just one point.

On 10 November 2014, Real Sociedad announced David Moyes as the chosen manager to replace Jagoba Arrasate, who was sacked following a series of poor results. Moyes became the sixth British manager in the club's history, however he was sacked 9 November 2015 after falling to 16th in La Liga. Later that day, he was replaced by Eusebio Sacristán.

Sacristán signed an initial contract until 30 June 2017. His contract was renewed in 2017, but Sacristán was ultimately dismissed after a string of poor performances left that 15th in the table and drawn into a relegation battle. Aiser Garitano became the next head coach, having arrived from Leganés. He lasted only seven months before being dismissed, with the team also in 15th place, with only five wins in his seventeen league matches.

Garitano was succeeded by reserve team manager and local boy Imanol Alguacil on 26 December 2018. During his tenure, he oversaw an attacking style of play combining pace, precision, power, and exuberance.

In 2008, at Real Sociedad's annual general meeting, Iñaki Badiola, at the time the club's president, accused the preceding club management of buying doping substances. In 2013 Badiola gave an extended interview were he accused José Luis Astiazarán's presidency of paying up to €300,000 to Eufemiano Fuentes to dope players on the team between 2001 and 2007. José Luis Astiazarán, who was Real Sociedad's president between 2001 and 2005, denied the claims.

Real Sociedad won its third Copa del Rey on 3 April 2021, the nearly year-long delayed 2020 Copa del Rey Final due to COVID-19, in a Basque derby against Athletic Bilbao.

Stadium and facility 

Real Sociedad plays home fixtures in the Anoeta Stadium. The venue is owned by the San Sebastián Municipal Council.

Name and colours
The club's name means "Royal Society of Football" in Spanish. The club's name was changed to Donostia Club de Futbol in 1931 with the advent of the Second Spanish Republic, but changed back to Real Sociedad after the Spanish Civil War in 1939. The club is nicknamed in Basque as Erreala or the txuri-urdin ("white-blue" due to the colours of their kit). The colours stem from the flag of San Sebastián: a blue canton on a white field.

Fanbase
The Spanish Centro de Investigaciones Sociológicas (Centre of Sociological Investigations) found out that of 2,473 adults interviewed in 49 provinces in 2007, 1.3% of the Spanish population have more feelings for Real Sociedad than any other club, and 1.5% have more feelings for La Real than any other club apart from their favourite.

In appreciation of the value of the supporters to the club – in the words of club president Jokin Aperribay, "The fans are the soul, the nourishment and the reason for Real Sociedad" – the players each wore the name of a randomly selected club member on their shirt for the match against Sevilla in December 2012.

Honours

Domestic

League
La Liga:
Winners (2): 1980–81, 1981–82
Segunda División:
Winners (3): 1948–49, 1966–67, 2009–10

Cups
Copa del Rey:
Winners (3): 1909, 1986–87, 2019–20
Supercopa de España:
Winners (1): 1982

Regional competitions
Gipuzkoa Championship:
Winners (6): 1918–19, 1922–23, 1924–25, 1926–27, 1928–29, 1932–33

Players

Current squad

Reserve team

Other players under contract

Out on loan

Seasons

Recent seasons

{|class="wikitable"
|-bgcolor="#efefef"
! Season
! Div.
! Pos.
! Pld
! W
! D
! L
! GF
! GA
! Pts
!Cup
!colspan=2|Europe
!Notes
|-
|2012–13
|1D
|align=right |4th
|align=right|38||align=right|18||align=right|12||align=right|8
|align=right|70||align=right|49||align=right|66
||Round of 16
|||||
|-
|2013–14
|1D
|align=right |7th
|align=right|38||align=right|16||align=right|11||align=right|11
|align=right|62||align=right|55||align=right|59
||Semi-final
|UCL|||Group stage|||
|-
|2014–15
|1D
|align=right |12th
|align=right|38||align=right|11||align=right|13||align=right|14
|align=right|44||align=right|51||align=right|46
||Round of 16
|UEL|||Play-off round|||
|-
|2015–16
|1D
|align=right |9th
|align=right|38||align=right|13||align=right|9||align=right|16
|align=right|45||align=right|48||align=right|48
||Round of 32
|||||
|-
|2016–17
|1D
|align=right |6th
|align=right|38||align=right|19||align=right|7||align=right|12
|align=right|59||align=right|53||align=right|64
||Quarter-final
|||||
|-
|2017–18
|1D
|align=right |12th
|align=right|38||align=right|14||align=right|7||align=right|17
|align=right|66||align=right|59||align=right|49
||Round of 32
|UEL|||Round of 32|||
|-
|2018–19
|1D
|align=right |9th
|align=right|38||align=right|13||align=right|11||align=right|14
|align=right|45||align=right|46||align=right|50
||Round of 16
||||||
|-
|2019–20
|1D
|align=right |6th
|align=right|38||align=right|16||align=right|8||align=right|14
|align=right|56||align=right|48||align=right|56
|bgcolor=gold|Winners
||||||
|-
|2020–21
|1D
|align=right |5th
|align=right|38||align=right|17||align=right|11||align=right|10
|align=right|59||align=right|38||align=right|62
||Round of 16
|UEL|||Round of 32|||
|-
|2021–22
|1D
|align=right |6th
|align=right|38||align=right|17||align=right|11||align=right|10
|align=right|40||align=right|37||align=right|62
||Quarter-finals
|UEL|||Knockout round play-offs|||
|}

Season to season

As Real Sociedad de Fútbol

76 seasons in La Liga
16 seasons in Segunda División

History in European competitions

Overall record
Accurate as of 9 March 2023

Source: UEFA.comPld = Matches played; W = Matches won; D = Matches drawn; L = Matches lost; GF = Goals for; GA = Goals against; GD = Goal Difference.

Coaching staff

Coaches

Player statistics

Most appearances

Top scorers

Notable former players
Note: this list includes players that have appeared in at least 100 league games and/or have reached international status.

See also
 Real Sociedad B – 1st reserve team in Segunda División 
Real Sociedad C - 2nd reserve team in Tercera División
Real Sociedad cantera - youth system up to 19 years, in leagues including División de Honor Juvenil
Real Sociedad Femenino — women's team in the Primera División Femenino

References

External links

  
 Real Sociedad at La Liga 
 Real Sociedad at UEFA 

 
La Liga clubs
Football clubs in the Basque Country (autonomous community)
Copa del Rey winners
Sports teams in San Sebastián
Multi-sport clubs in Spain
Organisations based in Spain with royal patronage
Association football clubs established in 1909
1909 establishments in Spain
1909 establishments
People named in the Panama Papers
Spanish field hockey clubs
Segunda División clubs